Kı Kué 196D, also known as Birch Lake, is an Indian reserve of the Smith's Landing First Nation in Alberta, located within the Regional Municipality of Wood Buffalo.

References

Indian reserves in Alberta